Empty Words: Writings '73–'78 is a book by American avant-garde composer John Cage (1912–1992), first published in 1979 by Wesleyan University Press.

Contents
 "Foreword" (1978)
 "Preface to Lecture on the Weather" (1979)
 "How the Piano Came to be Prepared" (1973)
 "Empty Words" (1974–5)
 "Where Are We Eating? and What Are We Eating? (38 Variations on a Theme by Alison Knowles)" (1975)
 "Series re Morris Graves" (1974)
 "Sixty-One Mesostics Re and Not Re Norman O. Brown" (1979)
 "Writing for the Second Time through Finnegans Wake" (1978)
 "The Future of Music" (1974)

Also included are the following mesostics:
 "Many Happy Returns" (1979)
 "A Long Letter" (1977)
 "Song" (1979)
 "For S. Fort, Dancer" (1979)
 "For William Mc N. Who studied with Ezra Pound" (1979)
 "Wright's Oberlin House Restored by E. Johnson" (1979)
 "'I'm the happiest person I know' (S.W.)" (1975)

See also
 List of compositions by John Cage

1979 books
Essay collections